Aïn Farès District is a district of Mascara Province, Algeria.

Municipalities
The district is further divided into 2 municipalities:
Aïn Fares
Mamounia

Districts of Mascara Province